The spectacled finch (Callacanthis burtoni) is a species of finch in the family Fringillidae. It is found in temperate northern regions of the Indian subcontinent, ranging across Afghanistan, India, Nepal, and Pakistan. Its natural habitat is temperate forests with a lush landscape.

References

spectacled finch
spectacled finch
Birds of Afghanistan
Birds of Pakistan
Birds of North India
Birds of Nepal
spectacled finch
Taxonomy articles created by Polbot
spectacled finch